Dichostates rubromaculatus is a species of beetle in the family Cerambycidae. It was described by Breuning in 1938. It is known from the Ivory Coast and Nigeria.

References

Crossotini
Beetles described in 1938